RSGB can refer to the following:

Organizations

 Radio Society of Great Britain, a radio operators organization established in 1913
 Reform Synagogues of Great Britain, former name for Movement for Reform Judaism (UK).
 Russian Soviet Government Bureau, informal diplomatic organization in the US from 1919 to 1921

Videogames

 Russian Spetsnaz Guards Brigade, a playable faction in the game Tom Clancy's EndWar